Kenneth Berle Wiberg (born September 22, 1927) is an American Professor Emeritus of organic chemistry at Yale University.  He contributed to many aspects of organic chemistry including physical and synthetic aspects.

Scholarship
In the area of synthetic organic chemistry, Wiberg and his students reported the preparation of highly strained organic compounds bicyclobutane and [1.1.1]propellane:

Recognition
 He is a member of the National Academy of Sciences and the American Academy of Arts and Sciences and an American Association of Arts and Sciences fellow.
 In 1988, he won the Arthur C. Cope Award.
 Asteroid 27267 Wiberg, discovered by American astronomer John V. McClusky at Fair Oaks Ranch Observatory  in 1999, was named in his honor. The official  was published by the Minor Planet Center on 7 January 2004.

References

External links 
 Homepage at Yale

1927 births
Living people
21st-century American chemists
Yale University faculty